The Medal of Honor is the highest military decoration presented by the United States government to a member of its armed forces.  The Battle of Iwo Jima took place in February and March 1945 during World War II and was marked by some of the fiercest fighting of the war. The American invasion, known as Operation Detachment, was charged with capturing the airfields on Iwo Jima.

The Imperial Japanese Army positions on the island were heavily fortified, with vast bunkers, hidden artillery, and 18 kilometers (11 mi) of tunnels. The battle was the first American attack on the Japanese Home Islands, and the Imperial soldiers defended their positions to the death; of the 21,000 Japanese soldiers present at the beginning of the battle, over 20,000 were killed and only 216 taken prisoner.

During the two-month-long battle, 27 U.S. military personnel were awarded the Medal of Honor for their actions. Of the 27 medals awarded, 22 were presented to Marines and five were presented to United States Navy sailors, four of whom were Hospital Corpsmen, a petty officer rank identified in the table by the WWII-era rating title Pharmacist's Mate. This represents over 25% of the 82 Medals of Honor awarded to Marines, and four of the seven Medals of Honor awarded to Hospital Corpsmen, in the entirety of World War II.  The 27 recipients held a wide range of ranks, from private to lieutenant colonel. Fourteen (52%) received their awards posthumously.

Recipients

See also
John Basilone, Medal of Honor recipient (Guadalcanal) killed on Iwo Jima and posthumously awarded the Navy Cross 
Raising the flag on Iwo Jima
The Unknown American Soldier from World War II

References
General

Inline

Medal of Honor recipients for the Battle of Iwo Jima
Iwo Jima
Iwo Jima